This article is about the particular significance of the year 1929 to Wales and its people.

Incumbents

Archbishop of Wales – Alfred George Edwards, Bishop of St Asaph
Archdruid of the National Eisteddfod of Wales – Pedrog

Events
6 January - The abbey on Caldey Island is handed over by the Benedictine order to its new owners, Belgian Cistercians.
February - 700 people are involved in a riot at Cwmfelinfach, when strikebreakers are used during an industrial dispute at the Nine Mile Point Colliery.
13 March - Former ironclad warship  is towed to Pembroke Dock to finish her service with the Royal Navy as an oil fuelling hulk.
24–26 April - The Royal Air Force's Squadron Leader Arthur G. Jones-Williams and Flight Lieutenant Norman H. Jenkins make the first non-stop flight from Britain to India.
30 May - In the United Kingdom general election:
Megan Lloyd George becomes Liberal MP for Anglesey – the first female MP in Wales.
Aneurin Bevan becomes MP for Ebbw Vale.
Other newly elected MPs include John Jestyn Llewellin at Uxbridge and Robert Richards at Wrexham.
Lewis Valentine is Plaid Cymru’s first parliamentary candidate. Plaid Cymru obtain a total of 609 votes in Wales.
J. H. Thomas becomes Lord Privy Seal in the new government.
9 July - After a collision with another vessel, HMS L12, the Royal Navy submarine H47 sinks off the Pembrokeshire coast, killing 21 crewmen.
10 July - Nine miners are killed in a mining accident at Milfraen, Blaenavon.
11 November -  of rain falls within a single day at Lluest-wen Reservoir, a record for a place in Wales. Below in the Rhondda this month, 400 people are made homeless by flooding.
25 November - Cargo steamer Molesey is wrecked on Skomer Island with the loss of 7 lives; British Movietone News shoots the first-ever sound footage of such an event.
28 November - Seven miners are killed in an accident at Wernbwll Colliery, Penclawdd.
date unknown
The University of Wales begins awarding teacher training certificates at colleges of education in Wales.
The number of motor vehicles in Wales exceeds 100,000 for the first time.

Arts and literature
The first Urdd National Eisteddfod is held, at Corwen Pavilion.

Awards
National Eisteddfod of Wales (held in Liverpool)
National Eisteddfod of Wales: Chair - David Emrys Jones, "Dafydd ap Gwilym"
National Eisteddfod of Wales: Crown - Caradog Prichard, "Y Gân Ni Chanwyd"

New books

English language
John Hugh Edwards - David Lloyd George, the Man and the Statesman
Richard Hughes - A High Wind in Jamaica
Elisabeth Inglis-Jones - Starved Fields
Huw Menai - The Passing of Guto
Bertrand Russell - Marriage and Morals

Welsh language
Ambrose Bebb - Llydaw
Kate Roberts - Rhigolau Bywyd

Music
W. Bradwen - Paradwys y Bardd
David John de Lloyd - Forty Welsh Traditional Tunes (arrangements)

Film
Ray Milland appears in his first Hollywood films.

Broadcasting
Welsh-language radio begins to be broadcast from the BBC's Daventry transmitter.

Sport
Football - The Football Association of Wales makes its first overseas tour, to Canada.
Rugby Union
23 February - 1929 Wales beat France 8–3 at the National Stadium in Cardiff

Births
2 January - John Lansdown, computer graphics pioneer (died 1999)
28 January - Clem Thomas, Wales and British Lions international rugby player (died 1996)
14 February - Wyn Morris, conductor (died 2010)
20 March - Herbert Wilson, physicist and biophysicist (died 2008)
25 April - Malcolm Thomas, Wales international rugby union captain (died 2012)
20 May - Bobi Jones, author (died 2017)
11 August - Alun Hoddinott, composer (died 2008)
2 September - Victor Spinetti, actor (died 2012)
October - Robyn Léwis, politician and archdruid (died 2019)
16 October - Ivor Allchurch, Wales international footballer (died 1997)
20 October - Colin Jeavons, actor
27 October - Alun Richards, novelist (died 2003)
2 November - Carwyn James, rugby coach (died 1983)
7 November - Urien Wiliam, dramatist (died 2006)
4 December - Ednyfed Hudson Davies, politician (died 2018)
30 December - Charles Lynn Davies, Wales international rugby player
date unknown
Paul Ferris, author
John Morgan, journalist and broadcaster (died 1988)

Deaths
2 January - David James, Wales international rugby player, 62
15 January - William Boyd Dawkins, geologist and historian, 91
20 February - Henry Bruce, 2nd Baron Aberdare, 77
16 April - Sir John Morris-Jones, poet and grammarian, 64
29 April - Violet Herbert, Countess of Powis, 63
30 April - Cliff Bowen, Wales international rugby player and county cricketer, 54
13 May - David Thomas (Afan), composer, 47
15 May - Grace Rhys, writer, wife of Ernest Rhys, 64
30 May - Owen Davies, Baptist minister and writer, 68/9
2 June - Fred Andrews, Wales international rugby player, 64
15 June - Llewellyn Atherley-Jones, politician, 78/79
23 July - John Hinds, businessman and politician, Lord Lieutenant of Carmarthenshire, 65
29 August - Viv Huzzey, Wales international rugby union player, 53
6 September - Richard Ellis, bibliographer and librarian, 62
19 October - John Evan Davies, Calvinistic Methodist minister and writer, 79
20 November - David Williams, archdeacon of Cardigan, 88
7 December - Jenkin Jones, trade union leader, 70
17 December - Arthur G. Jones-Williams, aviation pioneer, 31 (air crash)
21 December - James Williams, hockey player, 51
date unknown - John Evan Davies, minister and writer, 78/9

See also
 1929 in Northern Ireland

References

Wales